Rathmore is a Gaelic Athletic Association club from Rathmore, County Kerry, Ireland.  Together with 12 other football clubs (Cordal, Dr. Crokes, Currow, Firies, Fossa, Glenflesk, Gneeveguilla, Kilcummin, Legion, Listry, Rathmore, Scartaglin and Spa) they form the East Kerry Division of the GAA county of Kerry Notable players include Paul Murphy, Shane Ryan, Aidan o' Mahony.

Rathmore offer Hurling as well, but they do not play above intermediate level.  They play in the Kerry Senior Football Championship. Rathmore GAA was founded in 1888. Their original colours were green. Their former residence was known as the "lawn".  The East Kerry board runs its own competitions for clubs within the division. The most important is the O'Donoghue Cup which is awarded to the winners of the East Kerry Senior Football Championship. In 1963 they became the first rural club to win the championship.

The club once played in the Kerry Senior Hurling Championship, making it to the final in 1932 but lost out to Causeway in the final. Now hurling is played at under-age level and in 2022 Rathmore will field a team in the Kerry County Junior Championship.

Achievements

Football
 Kerry County Club Championship (1) 2011 Runners-Up 2010, 2012
 Kerry County Football League Division 1: (1) 2002
 Kerry Intermediate Football Championship: (2) 1999, 2022
 Munster Intermediate Club Football Championship: (1) 2022
 All-Ireland Intermediate Club Football Championship: (1) 2022
 Kerry Junior Football Championship: (2) 1968, 1997 Runners-Up 1988, 1993, 1996
 Kerry Minor Football Championship: Runners Up 2001 (with Glenflesk)
 East Kerry Senior Football Championship: (8) 1963, 1978, 1984, 2005, 2014, 2015, 2016, 2017
 East Kerry Junior Football Championship: (3) 2009, 2012, 2015

Hurling

 Kerry Junior Hurling Championship: (1) 1987 Runners-Up 2022
 Kerry Senior Hurling Championship: Runner-Up 1932

Ladies Gaelic football
Rathmore Ladies club has also followed through the years with the men's club. The ladies decided in the year 2000 that they would go out on their own and not under the men's club anymore. This continued to be a great success for Rathmore winning many challenges throughout the years at all ages.the pat lawlor, the co championship division A 2005 defeat over Castleisland, players including Aoife O'Sullivan, Ashling Desmond, Jacinta Murphy, Noreen and Eileen Murphy, Marie Kelleher, Michelle Knee, Amy Murphy, Sheilann Moynihan, Jodie O Sullivan and many more and many under age levels won.

Famous players
 Din Joe Crowley
 Declan O'Keeffe
 Tom O'Sullivan
 Aidan O'Mahony
 Paul Murphy
 Shane Ryan

References

External links
 http://www.eastkerrygaa.com/
 https://web.archive.org/web/20080406073856/http://archives.tcm.ie/irishexaminer/1998/10/05/shead.htm
 https://web.archive.org/web/20091109031816/http://archives.tcm.ie/irishexaminer/1998/10/02/shead.htm
 https://web.archive.org/web/20090208134602/http://archives.tcm.ie/thekingdom/2007/06/14/story24355.asp

Gaelic games clubs in County Kerry
Gaelic football clubs in County Kerry
Hurling clubs in County Kerry